Mr. Arsenic is a 30-minute American anthology television series featuring stories that provided detailed information on crimes and criminals from current headlines.  It was hosted by Buron Turkus, author of Murder, Inc., The Story of the Syndicate.  A total of eight episodes aired on the ABC from May 8, 1952 to June 27, 1952.

References

External links

Mr. Arsenic at CVTA with list of episodes

1950s American anthology television series
1952 American television series debuts
1952 American television series endings
American Broadcasting Company original programming
Black-and-white American television shows